Africanella isaacsi is a species of sea snail, a marine gastropod mollusk in the family Muricidae, the murex snails or rock snails.

Description

Distribution

References

External links

 Vermeij G.J. & Houart R. (1999). Description of Africanella n. gen. (Gastropoda: Muricidae: Ocenebrinae) and review of some West African ocenebrine genera. Basteria. 63(1–3): 17–25

Ocenebrinae
Gastropods described in 1984